Thruway may refer to:

Amtrak Thruway Motorcoach, an intercity busing service operated by Amtrak
Harbor Tunnel Thruway, a freeway in the vicinity of Baltimore, Maryland, United States
New York State Thruway, a toll highway in New York, United States
In its most generic sense, another term for controlled-access highway